Meall Buidhe is a Munro situated in the southern highlands of Scotland. It forms the northern side of Loch an Daimh and is often climbed in conjunction with Stuchd an Lochain.  The normal route climbs north from the eastern end of the loch until easier ground is reached.  The route angles east and then north once the ridge is gained.  Strong walkers can continue round the loch and take in a Corbett, Sron a' Choire Chnapanich, and the aforementioned Stuchd an Lochain.

References

Munros
Marilyns of Scotland
Mountains and hills of the Southern Highlands
Mountains and hills of Stirling (council area)